Paul Wittgenstein (November 5, 1887March 3, 1961) was an Austrian-American concert pianist notable for commissioning new piano concerti for the left hand alone, following the amputation of his right arm during the First World War. He devised novel techniques, including pedal and hand-movement combinations, that allowed him to play chords previously regarded as impossible for a five-fingered pianist.

He was an older brother of the philosopher Ludwig Wittgenstein.

Early life

Wittgenstein was born in Vienna, the fourth son of the industrialist Karl Wittgenstein and Leopoldine Maria Josefa Kalmus. He was raised as a Catholic; three of his grandparents had converted from Judaism as adults. Only his maternal grandmother had no Jewish lineage. His brother Ludwig was born two years later. The household was frequently visited by prominent cultural figures, among them the composers Johannes Brahms, Gustav Mahler, Josef Labor, and Richard Strauss, with whom the young Paul played duets. His grandmother, Fanny Wittgenstein, was a first cousin of the violinist Joseph Joachim, whom she adopted and took to Leipzig to study with Felix Mendelssohn.

He studied with Malvine Brée and later with a much better known figure, the Polish virtuoso Theodor Leschetizky. He made his public début in 1913, attracting favourable reviews. The following year, however, World War I broke out, and he was called up for military service. He was shot in the elbow and captured by the Russians during the Battle of Galicia, and his right arm had to be amputated.

New career as a left-handed pianist

During his recovery in a prisoner-of-war camp in Omsk in Siberia, he resolved to continue his career using only his left hand. Through the Danish Ambassador, he wrote to his old teacher Josef Labor, who was blind, asking for a concerto for the left hand. Labor responded quickly, saying he had already started work on a piece. Following the end of the war, Wittgenstein studied intensely, arranging pieces for the left hand alone and learning the new composition written for him by Labor. Once again he began to give concerts. Many reviews were qualified with comments that he played very well for a man with one arm, but he persevered.

He then approached more famous composers, asking them to write material for him to perform. Benjamin Britten, Paul Hindemith, Alexandre Tansman, Erich Wolfgang Korngold, Sergei Prokofiev, Karl Weigl, Franz Schmidt, Sergei Bortkiewicz, and Richard Strauss all produced pieces for him. Maurice Ravel wrote his Piano Concerto for the Left Hand, which became more famous than any of the other compositions that Wittgenstein inspired. But when Wittgenstein made changes to the score for the première, Ravel became incensed and the two never reconciled.

Wittgenstein did not perform every piece he had commissioned. He told Prokofiev that he did not understand his 4th Piano Concerto but would some day play it; however, he never did so. He later stated that "Even a concerto Prokofiev has written for me I have not yet played because the inner logic of the work is not clear to me, and, of course I can't play it until it is." He rejected outright Hindemith's Piano Music with Orchestra Op. 29; he hid the score in his study, and it was not discovered until after his widow's death in 2002 (by which time Hindemith himself had been dead for 39 years). He was able to take this approach because he inserted into his contracts with composers the stipulation that he held the unique performing rights on a composition during his lifetime. As Wittgenstein explained to Siegfried Rapp on June 5, 1950:

You don't build a house just so that someone else can live in it. I commissioned and paid for the works, the whole idea was mine ... But those works to which I still have the exclusive performance rights are to remain mine as long as I still perform in public; that's only right and fair. Once I am dead or no longer give concerts, then the works will be available to everyone because I have no wish for them to gather dust in libraries to the detriment of the composer.

(Siegfried Rapp was to premiere Prokofiev's 4th Piano Concerto in 1956, five years before Wittgenstein's death.)

Many of the pieces Wittgenstein commissioned are still frequently performed today by two-armed pianists; in particular, the Austrian pianist Friedrich Wührer, claiming the composer's sanction but apparently over Wittgenstein's objections, created two-hand arrangements of Franz Schmidt's Wittgenstein-inspired left-hand works. Pianists born after Wittgenstein who for one reason or another have lost the use of their right hands, such as Leon Fleisher (although he eventually recovered his right hand's abilities) and João Carlos Martins, have also played works composed for him.

As a performer, Wittgenstein's posthumous reputation is mixed. Alexander Waugh comments in The House of Wittgenstein: A Family at War that between 1928 and 1934, Wittgenstein was "a world-class pianist of outstanding technical ability and sensitivity" but that his playing grew increasingly "harsh and ham-fisted". Orchestras and conductors that had invited him once, seldom sought to rebook him. His tendency to alter and rewrite, without authorisation, the works he had commissioned have also contributed to his controversial musical status.

Nazi persecution and emigration 
The Wittgenstein family had converted to Christianity three generations before his birth on the paternal side and two generations before on the maternal side; nonetheless they were of mainly Jewish descent, and under the Nuremberg laws they were classed as Jews. Following the rise of the Nazi Party and the annexation of Austria, Paul tried to persuade his elder sisters Hermine and Helene (69 and 64 years old at the time) to leave Vienna, but they demurred: they were attached to their homes there, and could not believe such a distinguished family as theirs was in real danger. Ludwig had already been living in England for some years, and Margaret (Gretl) was married to an American. Paul himself, who was no longer permitted to perform in public concerts under the Nazis, departed for the United States in 1938. From there he and Gretl, with some assistance from Ludwig (who acquired British nationality in 1939), managed to use family finances (mostly held abroad) and legal connections to attain non-Jewish status for their sisters.

The family's financial portfolio consisted of properties and other assets in Germany and occupied lands with a total value of about US$6 billion, which may have been the largest private fortune in Europe. Essentially all family assets were surrendered to the Nazis in return for protection afforded the two sisters under exceptional interpretations of racial laws, allowing them to continue to live in their family palace in Vienna.

Personal life
His wife, Hilde, had been his pupil; they had two children before their marriage, the first conceived after the first piano lesson, when Hilde was eighteen years old and Paul was forty-seven. Because Hilde was not Jewish, Paul was open to charges of "racial defilement"; in 1938 he fled to New York. In 1940 he spent seven months in Cuba, attempting to secure permanent visas for Hilde and himself, and it was in Havana, on 20 August 1940, that they married in a Catholic ceremony. When his wife and children arrived in the United States in 1941 he set them up in a house on Long Island, which he visited at weekends from his apartment on Riverside Drive. Wittgenstein became an American citizen in 1946 and spent the rest of his life in the United States, where he did much teaching as well as playing. He died in New York City in 1961 and was initially buried on Long Island, but was later disinterred and reburied in Pinegrove Cemetery, South Sterling, Pike County, Pennsylvania, where his widow had moved.

Art collector
Wittgenstein collected artworks by artists of the Vienna Secession, especially Gustav Klimt. He also owned a number of works by Rudolf von Alt. He also had a large collection of music and musical instruments.

In popular culture
John Barchilon wrote a novel based on Wittgenstein's life, called The Crown Prince (1984).

An episode of the long-running American television series M*A*S*H, "Morale Victory", featured James Stephens as a drafted concert pianist with debilitating nerve damage in his right hand after being wounded in combat. Charles Winchester (David Ogden Stiers) provides him with the music for Ravel's Concerto for the Left Hand, tells him Wittgenstein's story and encourages him not to abandon his musical gift.

Wittgenstein appears as a character in Derek Jarman's 1993 film Wittgenstein, about his brother Ludwig.

Wittgenstein is referenced extensively in the latter half of Brian Evenson's novel Last Days.

Wittgenstein's life is the basis for the Neil Halstead song "Wittgenstein's Arm" on his 2012 album Palindrome Hunches.

The short story "Transfigured Night" (found in the collections The Dream Lover and The Destiny of Natalie 'X''' by William Boyd) features Paul Wittgenstein.

References

 Citations 

 Sources Books 
 
 
 Thiollet, Jean-Pierre (2017). « W comme Wittgenstein », in Improvisation so piano, Neva Ed., 2017, pp. 121-127. News 
 Online sources''

Further reading
 
 
  Part 2, Part 3

External links
 
 1933 video of Paul Wittgenstein performing Ravel's Piano Concerto for Left Hand at Salle Pleyel in Paris, France

 
1887 births
1961 deaths
20th-century classical pianists
20th-century American pianists
20th-century American male musicians
Austrian classical pianists
Austrian people of German descent
Austrian people of Jewish descent
Austrian Christians
American male pianists
American people of Austrian-Jewish descent
American classical pianists
Jewish classical pianists
Male classical pianists
Musicians from Vienna
Austrian amputees
Amputee musicians
Classical pianists who played with one arm
Austrian prisoners of war
Austro-Hungarian military personnel of World War I
Paul
Jewish art collectors
Emigrants from Nazi Germany to the United States